AppleCare+ is Apple's brand name for extended warranty and technical support plans for their devices. AppleCare+ extends the devices' one year limited warranty and the 90 days of technical support. It also includes unlimited repairs for accidental damage repair at discounted prices every 12 months.  The AppleCare Protection Plan is available for many Apple products including Mac computers and displays, Beats Headphones, HomePods, iPhones and iPads, Apple Watches, and Apple TVs. AppleCare plans include Apple software associated with the covered hardware. Customers can also buy additional support and training through AppleCare.

AppleCare+ and AppleCare Protection Plan
Every Apple Display, Apple TV, Apple Watch, iPad, iPod, iPhone, HomePod, Mac, and AirPods comes with complimentary telephone technical support and a limited warranty from Apple. The AppleCare Protection Plan and AppleCare+ extends the service coverage and provides one-stop service and support from Apple experts.

The AppleCare Protection Plan is sold by Apple and its authorized resellers for Apple TV and AirPort exclusively and must be phrased at the time of purchase or AppleCare Protection Plan must be purchased within 30 days in Japan and within 60 days where available. AppleCare+ is available as an add-on purchase with every Apple Display, Apple Watch, iPad, iPod, iPhone, HomePod, Mac, and AirPods at the time of purchase; otherwise AppleCare+ or AppleCare Protection Plan must be purchased within 30 days in Japan and within 60 days where available.

For all hardware devices, following the included 90-day telephone/Internet support and one-year hardware warranty, buying the AppleCare Protection Plan for a MacBook computer or a separate AppleCare Protection Plan for Apple displays extends both support and hardware to three years. Additionally, buying AppleCare+ for iPods and other iOS devices can extend both support and hardware to two years. Extended coverage under the Protection Plan is available for the Apple Watch for either two or three years, depending on the particular model of the device. The AppleCare Protection Plan extends the complimentary 90-day coverage to three years from the original device purchase date for Mac or Apple displays and two years from the given device's purchase date for iPads, iPhones, iPods, or Apple TV devices.

AppleCare also includes an express replacement service for iPad and iPhone. AppleCare+ insures against accidental damage, unlike the statutory warranty. For Mac computers with or without any additional included covered Mac accessories, (or separately purchased Apple monitors with their own purchased Apple Protection Plan) this still extends cover to a third year from the statutory two years.

AppleCare+ with Theft and Loss coverage 
Theft and loss coverage is only provided in Japan, the United States, United Kingdom, Australia and Germany. AppleCare+ with theft and loss includes up to two incidents of accidental damage, theft or loss coverage at a reduced cost to the end consumer. Currently Theft and Loss coverage is unavailable in some parts of Europe, South America, Asia Pacific, Africa, North America (Canada) or Antarctica.

Included Mac accessory coverage
Users who purchase an AppleCare Protection Plan with any Mac computer are also automatically entitled to receive coverage for some other related Apple accessories. Along with coverage for the MacBook, any additional Apple display purchased at the same time as a Macbook device and/or any Apple AirPort device (e.g., AirPort Express Base Station, AirPort Extreme Base Station, or Time Capsule) is covered. (Note: Although the AirPort device or Time Capsule must be purchased up to two years before the MacBook purchase or during the term of the AppleCare Protection Plan coverage).

Competition
Today, there are several third-party warranty providers and traditional insurance providers that will also cover Apple products. Some may include accident, loss, and theft coverage as well as hardware failure warranties. Some major retailers that sell Apple products sell their own extended service plans as well.

AppleCare Extended Service
In some countries or territories where there are no local Apple offices, such as parts of Latin America, the "AppleCare Extended Service" product is available in place of the AppleCare product. This offers the same hardware warranty without phone/Internet support.

Compliance in various jurisdictions

China 
On March 15, 2013, China Central Television aired a program for the World Consumer Rights Day. The program criticized the issue associated with Apple warranty issues in China. The report said, an iPhone always gets an old back cover when being repaired in China. It also states that the warranty period for changed product is only 90 days and the warranty period for Macintosh and iPad are not according to Chinese laws to get warranty in China. On April 1, 2013, Apple CEO Tim Cook apologized to Chinese consumers for the China warranty policy and changed the policy.

European Union 
In some parts of European countries a part of the European Union (EU), local regulations gives consumers a minimum of two years warranty on hardware defects that existed at time of purchase, which overlaps the benefits of AppleCare. This effectively means that, in certain countries in the EU, an AppleCare Protection Plan still extends phone/Internet support from 90 days on all devices. In most countries the onus under the EU law is on the merchant to establish that a hardware defect did not exist at time of purchase for the first six months after purchase. After the six-month-period this is reversed, meaning that the customer may need to establish that a hardware defect did exist when they received the product. Unlike the statutory guarantee AppleCare also covers defects that appeared after purchase, if the device was handled correctly.

Italy 
On December 27, 2011, Apple was fined a total of €900,000 by the Italian Antitrust Authority for failing to properly inform customers of their legal right to two years of warranty service under Italy's Consumer Code. According to the Italian agency Apple only disclosed its own standard one-year warranty and offered to sell customers AppleCare for one additional year instead of abiding by the law. The agency fined Apple €400,000 for failing to disclose the legally mandated two-year warranty and €500,000 for selling overlapping AppleCare coverage.

References

External links 
Apple - AppleCare products and services
Apple Products and Statutory Warranty

Apple Inc. services